Kimberley railway station may refer to:
 Kimberley railway station (South Africa) in Kimberley, Northern Cape, South Africa
or to any of the three railway stations in the Kimberley, Nottinghamshire area, these are:
 Kimberley West railway station, on the Midland Railways Basford to Bennerley Junction branch
 Kimberley East railway station, on the GNR Derbyshire and Staffordshire Extension
 Watnall railway station, on the Midland Railways Bennerley and Bulwell branch

See also
 Kimberley Park railway station, Norfolk